In the field of hydrogeology, storage properties are physical properties that characterize the capacity of an aquifer to release groundwater. These properties are storativity (S), specific storage (Ss) and specific yield (Sy). According to Groundwater, by Freeze and Cherry (1979), specific storage,  [m−1], of a saturated aquifer is defined as the volume of water that a unit volume of the aquifer releases from storage under a unit decline in hydraulic head.

They are often determined using some combination of field tests (e.g., aquifer tests) and laboratory tests on aquifer material samples. Recently, these properties have been also determined using remote sensing data derived from Interferometric synthetic-aperture radar.

Storativity
Storativity or the storage coefficient is the volume of water released from storage per unit decline in hydraulic head in the aquifer, per unit area of the aquifer. Storativity is a dimensionless quantity, and is always greater than 0.

  is the volume of water released from storage ([L3]); 
  is the hydraulic head ([L])
  is the specific storage
  is the specific yield
  is the thickness of aquifer
  is the area ([L2])

Confined 
For a confined aquifer or aquitard, storativity is the vertically integrated specific storage value. Specific storage is the volume of water released from one unit volume of the aquifer under one unit decline in head.  This is related to both the compressibility of the aquifer and the compressibility of the water itself. Assuming the aquifer or aquitard is homogeneous:

Unconfined 
For an unconfined aquifer, storativity is approximately equal to the specific yield since the release from specific storage is typically orders of magnitude less.

The specific storage is the amount of water that a portion of an aquifer releases from storage, per unit mass or volume of the aquifer, per unit change in hydraulic head, while remaining fully saturated.

Mass specific storage is the mass of water that an aquifer releases from storage, per mass of aquifer, per unit decline in hydraulic head:

where
 is the mass specific storage ([L−1]);
 is the mass of that portion of the aquifer from which the water is released ([M]);
 is the mass of water released from storage ([M]); and
 is the decline in hydraulic head ([L]).

Volumetric specific storage (or volume-specific storage) is the volume of water that an aquifer releases from storage, per volume of the aquifer, per unit decline in hydraulic head (Freeze and Cherry, 1979):

where
 is the volumetric specific storage ([L−1]);
 is the bulk volume of that portion of the aquifer from which the water is released ([L3]);
 is the volume of water released from storage ([L3]); 
 is the decline in pressure(N•m−2 or [ML−1T−2]) ;
 is the decline in hydraulic head ([L]) and
 is the specific weight of water (N•m−3 or [ML−2T−2]).

In hydrogeology, volumetric specific storage is much more commonly encountered than mass specific storage. Consequently, the term  specific storage generally refers to volumetric specific storage.

In terms of measurable physical properties, specific storage can be expressed as

where
 is the specific weight of water (N•m−3 or [ML−2T−2])
 is the porosity of the material (dimensionless ratio between 0 and 1)
 is the compressibility of the bulk aquifer material (m2N−1 or [LM−1T2]), and
 is the compressibility of water (m2N−1 or [LM−1T2])

The compressibility terms relate a given change in stress to a change in volume (a strain). These two terms can be defined as:

where
 is the effective stress (N/m2 or [MLT−2/L2])

These equations relate a change in total or water volume ( or ) per change in applied stress (effective stress —  or pore pressure — ) per unit volume. The compressibilities (and therefore also Ss) can be estimated from laboratory consolidation tests (in an apparatus called a consolidometer), using the consolidation theory of soil mechanics (developed by Karl Terzaghi).

Specific yield

Specific yield, also known as the drainable porosity, is a ratio, less than or equal to the effective porosity, indicating the volumetric fraction of the bulk aquifer volume that a given aquifer will yield when all the water is allowed to drain out of it under the forces of gravity:

where
 is the volume of water drained, and
 is the total rock or material volume

It is primarily used for unconfined aquifers, since the elastic storage component, is relatively small and usually has an insignificant contribution. Specific yield can be close to effective porosity, but there are several subtle things which make this value more complicated than it seems. Some water always remains in the formation, even after drainage; it clings to the grains of sand and clay in the formation. Also, the value of specific yield may not be fully realized for a very long time, due to complications caused by unsaturated flow.  Problems related to unsaturated flow are simulated using the numerical solution of Richards Equation, which requires estimation of the specific yield, or the numerical solution of the Soil Moisture Velocity Equation, which does not require estimation of the specific yield.

See also
 Aquifer test
 Soil mechanics
 Groundwater flow equation describes how these terms are used in the context of solving groundwater flow problems

References
 Freeze, R.A. and J.A. Cherry. 1979. Groundwater. Prentice-Hall, Inc. Englewood Cliffs, NJ. 604 p.
 Morris, D.A. and A.I. Johnson. 1967. Summary of hydrologic and physical properties of rock and soil materials as analyzed by the Hydrologic Laboratory of the U.S. Geological Survey 1948-1960. U.S. Geological Survey Water Supply Paper 1839-D. 42 p.
De Wiest, R. J. (1966). On the storage coefficient and the equations of groundwater flow. Journal of Geophysical Research, 71(4), 1117–1122.

Specific

Hydrology
Aquifers
Water
Soil mechanics
Soil physics